Sellen Construction is a Seattle, Washington-based construction firm. Its clients have included Microsoft, Amazon.com, AT&T, Russell Investments, The Bill and Melinda Gates Foundation, Seattle Children's Hospital, and Vulcan Inc.

History 
Sellen has operated continuously as a general contractor since its founding in 1944 in the South Lake Union neighborhood of Seattle by John H. Sellen. Today, Sellen Construction is one of the largest commercial builders in the Pacific Northwest building projects in commercial office, healthcare, life science, and arts and non-profit sectors.

Notable projects 

 Amazon.com Headquarters - Denny Triangle Seattle
 Amazon.com Bellevue 600
 Seattle Spheres
 Microsoft Campus Renovation
 Seattle Children's Hospital - Additions and Renovations
 MOHAI Renovation
 The Bill and Melinda Gates Foundation Campus
 WaMu Tower/Seattle Art Museum Expansion (Russell Investments Center)
 Pike Place Market, MarketFront Expansion
 1918 Eighth Avenue
 Russell Investment Headquarters
 Seattle Art Museum's Olympic Sculpture Park
 Seattle Children's Hospital
 2201 Westlake/ Enso
 International Fountain at Seattle Center
 Red Square Quadrangle - University of Washington
 Fairmont Olympic Hotel
 Century Square
 US Bank Centre (Pacific First Center)
 Microsoft Redmond West
 ACT Theater (Seattle)
 Swedish Medical Center, First Hill, Cherry Hill
 Pacific Place
 Key Center, Bellevue
 Fisher Plaza
 Watermark Tower

References

Construction and civil engineering companies of the United States
Companies based in Seattle

https://www.bizjournals.com/profile/company/org_ch_a3a4c0e470042efaaa1fdd14b4888940
https://www.bizjournals.com/seattle/news/2021/03/09/amazon-picks-bellevue-office-tower.html?iana=cp_news_link
First look: Amazon's Bellevue 600 skyscrapers designed to be gateway (Images)
Seattle construction industry has new focus on sustainability
Sellen CEO